Fay Morgan Taylor (June 25, 1909 – Sept 19, 1990) was an American Modernist artist.

Life and work
Born in Pittsburgh in 1909. After studying at the University of Washington, Morgan came to San Francisco in 1930. She continued her studies at the California School of Fine Arts and graduated from UC Berkeley in 1934. The following year she married artist Farwell Taylor. The Taylors maintained a studio in San Francisco until 1949 and then moved across the bay to Mill Valley where she lived until arson destroyed her home and all its contents in the mid-1980s. She then moved to Novato, California where she remained until her demise on 1990. A modernist painter, her works include philosophical studies and abstracts. Exhibition: SFAA; SFMA, 1935; Rotunda Gallery, City of Paris. Shanta State Historical Museum.

References

External links 
 images of Fay Christina Morgan Taylor paintings at askART

1909 births
1990 deaths
American contemporary painters
Modern artists
American women painters
Painters from California
20th-century American painters
20th-century American women artists
Artists from the San Francisco Bay Area
People from Novato, California